Iyabo Ismaila is a Nigerian Paralympic powerlifter. She represented Nigeria at the 2000 Summer Paralympics and at the 2004 Summer Paralympics and she won the gold medal in the women's 48 kg event in 2000. In 2004, she competed in the women's 52 kg event where she did not record a mark.

References

External links 
 

Living people
Year of birth missing (living people)
Place of birth missing (living people)
Powerlifters at the 2000 Summer Paralympics
Powerlifters at the 2004 Summer Paralympics
Medalists at the 2000 Summer Paralympics
Paralympic gold medalists for Nigeria
Paralympic medalists in powerlifting
Paralympic powerlifters of Nigeria
Nigerian powerlifters
20th-century Nigerian women